In mathematics, a functional calculus is a theory allowing one to apply mathematical functions to mathematical operators. It is now a branch (more accurately, several related areas) of the field of functional analysis, connected with spectral theory. (Historically, the term was also used synonymously with calculus of variations; this usage is obsolete, except for functional derivative. Sometimes it is used in relation to types of functional equations, or in logic for systems of predicate calculus.)

If it does, then we are no longer using  on its original function domain. In the tradition of operational calculus, algebraic expressions in operators are handled irrespective of their meaning. The idea of a functional calculus is to create a principled approach to this kind of overloading of the notation.

The most immediate case is to apply polynomial functions to a square matrix, extending what has just been discussed. In the finite-dimensional case, the polynomial functional calculus yields quite a bit of information about the operator. For example, consider the family of polynomials which annihilates an operator . This family is an ideal in the ring of polynomials. Furthermore, it is a nontrivial ideal: let  be the finite dimension of the algebra of matrices, then  is linearly dependent. So  for some scalars , not all equal to 0. This implies that the polynomial  lies in the ideal. Since the ring of polynomials is a principal ideal domain, this ideal is generated by some polynomial . Multiplying by a unit if necessary, we can choose  to be monic. Also, sometimes  can be used to calculate the exponential of  efficiently.

The polynomial calculus is not as informative in the infinite-dimensional case. Consider the unilateral shift with the polynomials calculus; the ideal defined above is now trivial. Thus one is interested in functional calculi more general than polynomials. The subject is closely linked to spectral theory, since for a diagonal matrix or multiplication operator, it is rather clear what the definitions should be.

See also

References

External links